Beyond Even (1992–2006) is a 2007 double disc ambient album by English musicians Robert Fripp and Brian Eno. Their fourth studio album, it was first released on the Discipline Global Mobile website as a digital download, entitled The Cotswold Gnomes, on 23 October 2006.

Track listing

Disc one
 Ringing Beat – 5:14
 Gasp – 2:06
 Sneering Loop – 3:11 
 Tripoli 2020 – 6:03
 Behold the Child – 2:50
 Timean Sparkles – 2:36
 Dirt Loop – 4:01
 The Idea of Decline – 4:19
 Deep Indian Long – 4:57
 Hopeful Timean (with Tim Harries) – 4:33
 Glass Structure – 3:55
 Voices – 4:52
 Cross Crisis in Lust Storm (with Trey Gunn) – 5:20

Disc two
 Ringing Beat – 5:23 
 Gasp – 2:21
 Sneering Loop – 3:22 
 Tripoli 2020 – 6:14
 Behold the Child – 3:00
 Timean Sparkles – 2:47
 Dirt Loop – 4:28
 The Idea of Decline – 4:24
 Deep Indian Long – 5:12
 Hopeful Timean – 4:43
 Glass Structure – 4:09
 Voices – 5:10
 Cross Crisis in Lust Storm (with Trey Gunn) – 5:24

Notes
 Disc two originally released in 2006 as digital files. Previously unreleased on CD.
 Disc one previously unreleased segued version.

References

Brian Eno albums
Robert Fripp albums
2006 albums
Collaborative albums